Bérengère Krief (born 16 April 1983) is a French actress and comedian.

Filmography

Theater

References

External links

 
 

French film actresses
1983 births
Living people
21st-century French actresses
Actresses from Lyon
French television actresses